Opobo/Nkoro is a Local Government Area in Rivers State, Nigeria. It is part of the  Andoni/Gokana/Khana/Oyigbo/Tai/Eleme  constituency of the Nigerian National Assembly delegation from Rivers. The capital of Opobo/Nkoro is Opobo Town.

References

Local Government Areas in Rivers State
Populated coastal places in Nigeria